World Class Wreckin' Cru was an American electro group, during the 1980s in the Los Angeles area, that contributed to rap's development. Two of its members, Dr. Dre and DJ Yella, attained greater fame as members of N.W.A, which pioneered gangsta rap. A song by the Cru had also featured R&B singer Michel'le.

Early career
World Class Wreckin' Cru debuted in the nightclub Eve After Dark, owned by Alonzo Williams, an early West Coast DJ very popular in the Los Angeles area. In the 1970s, Williams had begun producing dance songs under the name Disco Construction, named after funk group Brass Construction. At his songs' popularity, Williams arranged nightclub performances. Initially directing its music program was Detroit-born Andre "Unknown DJ" Manuel, influenced by East Coast sounds, like Soulsonic Force, Orbit, and Scorpio.

As the 1980s opened, electronic funk arrived, sampling drum beats and borrowing from old-school rap. Disco Construction created a subgroup, the Wreckin' Cru, which was the Lonzos' roadies. Later, this honorific prefix World Class signified a recording group. Lonzo hired two local DJs—Antoine "Yella" Carraby and Andre "Dr. Dre" Young—who became the original Mix Masters for KDAY. Wreckin' Cru performed in various shows elsewhere in Los Angeles, too, including shows promoted by Lonzo as well as opening for New Edition.

Success and break up
Alonzo Williams created the label "Kru-cut" which began releasing The Wreckin' Cru music through the mid-1980s with very minimal resources through Macola Records", a local independent record manufacturing and distributing company. The Cru released the single "Slice", followed by "Surgery" and a full-length album titled World Class.  The success of their early releases led to a major record deal with CBS/Epic Records.  After being signed to CBS records Lonzo was asked if he had any other acts. After seeing Dre's cousin Jinx' group perform in a rap contest, a teenage group called C.I.A. (Cru' In Action) starring O'Shea "Ice Cube" Jackson, Dre's cousin Tony ‘Sir Jinx’ Wheaton and Darrell ‘K-Dee’ Johnson, who with Dre would record a demo tape called "She's a Skag". The group was then signed to a single deal with CBS.

After being released from CBS the WCWC had the group's biggest hit, "Turn off The Lights." WCWC, known as a dance and romance act, also had songs like "Surgery," "Juice," "Cabbage Patch," and "Lovers."

By 1985 Kru-Cut had produced World Class’ debut album, World Class, with Cli-N-Tel leaving to control his own direction in life, leaving Shakespeare to step up to be the prominent MC as they signed with Epic Records. With this they released a string of singles and also their second album, Rapped In Romance.

World Class's success was building an army of fans in the underground scene and each member a valued reputation. At this stage the look of Prince and Michael Jackson's Thriller outfits were cool, glitzy purple leather suits, sequin suits not unlike the glam-rock look running parallel to this scene, Dre was growing tired of the image and considered Lonzo's direction to be soft and yearned to control his own expression in music.

At this time, Dre was working on side projects for local entrepreneur Eric "Eazy-E" Wright in the Kru-Cut studio, and Ice Cube was ghostwriting for the World Class single "House Calls/Cabbage Patch" in 1987. In April 1988, featuring Michel'le, Dre's girlfriend, their hit slow jam "Before You Turn off the Lights" peaked at #54 on the Billboard Black Singles Charts. The last time Dre was arrested and jailed for missed court appearances on multiple traffic violations was in 1986, when he owed $166, enough for an arrest warrant, and Lonzo refused to bail him out a third time. Eazy-E posted it in return for Dre's production for E's new record label, Ruthless Records. Eazy and Dre's combined collaboration of talent known as N.W.A. As a solo artist, Lonzo released another LP, titled Phases in Life, in 1990. World Class member Shakespeare sought to become a pastor.

Discography

Albums
World Class (Kru-Cut, 1985)
Rapped in Romance (Epic/CBS, 1986)

Singles
"Slice" (Kru-Cut, 1984)
"Surgery" (Kru-Cut, 1985)
"Juice" (Kru-Cut, 1985)
"House Calls" (Kru-Cut, 1987)
"Turn Off the Lights" (Kru-Cut, 1987)

Compilations
The Best of the World Class Wreckin' Cru (Kru-Cut, 1987)
Turn Off the Lights (Before The Attitude) (S.O.H., 1991)
Dr. Dre vs. World Class Wreckin' Crew (Street Dance, 2005)

References

External links 

Audio interview with Lonzo at SoundCloud
 

Dr. Dre
Musical groups established in 1984
Musical groups disestablished in 1988
Hip hop groups from California
American electro musicians
Electronic music groups from California